Quri Qaleh, also with Kurdish (native) pronunciation Qura Qala, is a village in Quri Qaleh Rural District, Shahu District, Ravansar County, Kermanshah Province, Iran. At the 2006 census, its population was 989, in 211 families.

Quri Qale Cave is nearby.

References 

Populated places in Ravansar County